Splish Splash is a  water park in Calverton, New York. It features 30 rides and is open from May through September. Travel Channel ranked Splish Splash as the third-best water park in the United States in the year 2009.

History
Splish Splash was built in 1989, headed by Chip Cleary with the original owners being the same as the owners of Adventureland. It opened in May 1991 with three body slides, two-speed slides, two kiddie pools, two tube slides, a lazy river, and a restaurant. The park has been owned and operated by Palace Entertainment since 1999. The park currently spans . In 2006, Splish Splash added a new funnel-shaped ride called Alien Invasion. In July 2008, they announced that they would be adding 7 rides over the next few years, including Dr. Von Dark's Tunnel of Terror for 2009, Kahuna Bay for 2011, Bootlegger's Run for 2013, The Battle of Mutiny Bay for 2014, and two new rides introduced in 2018, Riptide Racer and Bombs Away. In 2020, the attraction Battle for Mutiny Bay was removed, as well as opting to stay closed for the 2020 season due to the COVID-19 pandemic. Cliff Diver, an 80-foot tall body slide was removed in 2021.

List of water attractions

 Dinosaur Falls – Opened 1991, a ProSlide pipeline with 3 slides (re-named in 2012 from Splash Landing) (Single or Double Inner Tube) (1 or 2 Riders)
 Max Trax – Opened 1991, 2 plummet slides consisting of a 50' straight down slide and one two hump slide  (Body Slide)
 Lazy River – Opened 1991, a relaxing tube ride with fountains and wave area
 Hollywood Stunt Rider – Opened 2002, a dark mammoth family ride with a Hollywood theme (Family Raft) (2 - 4 Riders Required) 
 Hyperlight – Opened 1992, 2 enclosed tube slides (re-named and re-themed from The Abyss) (Single or Double Inner Tube) (1 or 2 Riders)
 Alien Invasion – Opened 2006, a ProSlide tornado with an alien abduction theme (Clover Leaf Raft) 
 Dr. Von Dark's Tunnel of Terror – Opened 2009, a ProSlide tantrum with high-speed 360 degree spins, and a  drop (Round Double Tube) (2 Riders Required) 
 Kahuna Bay – Opened 2011, a classic wave pool
 Dragon's Den – Opened 2004, a ProSlide cannon bowl with a dragon in the middle of the bowl (Double Tube) (2 Riders Required) 
 Mammoth River – Opened 1991, an open mammoth family raft ride (Family Raft) (3 - 5 Riders Required)
 Barrier Reef – Opened 1993, 2 enclosed high speed body slides 
 Giant Twister – Opened 1991, 3 open body slides
 Surf City – Opened 1995, a classic wave pool
 Soak City – a relaxing pool with in-water seats and water fountains
 Bootlegger's Run – Opened 2013, a water coaster featuring new generation hydromagnetic technology (New York's First Water Coaster) (Toboggan Inline Raft) (2 - 4 Riders Required)
Riptide Racer – Opened 2018,  the park's first unique face-first slide involving mats (1-4 riders, 4 tubes)
Bombs Away – Opened 2018,  double trapdoor body slides with a drop of 26 feet per second

Attractions for kids under 54 inches only
 The Elephant – an elephant slide with a falling spray of water. In 2015, it was replaced by a yellow submarine
 Kiddie Slides – 3 open body slides featuring the only water slide in the park adults can ride with their children
 Monsoon Lagoon – a shipwreck pool with a slide and many pirate themed objects that shoot water
 Octopus Pool – a large octopus in the middle of a pool with swings on the tentacles
 Pirates Cove – a pirate-themed pool with slides and water cannons

See also
 List of waterparks
 Waterparks

References

 In the episode "Maddie on Deck" of The Suite Life on Deck, the prince mentions that for their honeymoon they'll go to Splish Splash Waterpark.

External links
http://nymag.com/nymetro/urban/family/features/6152/ Splish Splash Review

Palace Entertainment
Tourist attractions on Long Island
Water parks in New York (state)
Tourist attractions in Suffolk County, New York
1991 establishments in New York (state)